The Real Boston Rams were an American amateur soccer club based in Quincy, Massachusetts. The Rams play in the USL Premier Development League, the fourth division of the American soccer pyramid. Founded in 2012, the club played until 2015.

History
The club was granted a franchise into the PDL on December 17, 2012. The Rams announced in April 2013 that they were to become the affiliate club of New England Revolution, allowing the Revolution's college aged academy players to turn out for the Rams. The deal also meant that revolution coaching staff would assist in the development of Rams players. The club played its first ever game, a friendly against Newtown Soccer Club on May 5, 2013. A week later, on May 11, the Rams played their first ever league game, a 3–0 defeat to CFC Azul.

Colors and badge
Real Boston Rams' colors were black and gold. The team's crest features a ram's head donning a crown, with the script "Boston 2012" above the ram's head. The official uniform colors were black and gold.

Players and staff

Team management

Year-by-year

References

External links
Official website
PDL Team Profile

2012 establishments in Massachusetts
Association football clubs established in 2012
Soccer clubs in Massachusetts
Defunct Premier Development League teams
2015 disestablishments in Massachusetts
Association football clubs disestablished in 2015
Quincy, Massachusetts
Sports in Norfolk County, Massachusetts